Johann Hermann Bauer (23 June 1861, Kotopeky – 5 April 1891, Görz) was an Austrian chess master.

Biography
Bauer was born in Kotopeky in Bohemia (then in the Austrian Empire). His father was an estate owner in Kotopeky and a formally trained painter later in Prague. His mother Eleonora was an older sister of Czech composer Josef Richard Rozkošný.
As a youth he settled in Vienna and won the master title at Frankfurt 1887 (the 5th DSB Congress, Hauptturnier A). His best tournament achievement was at Graz 1890 (+3 –0 =3) where he finished in 2nd place behind Gyula Makovetz and ahead of Emanuel Lasker and Georg Marco. In 1891 whilst playing in a double-round tournament at Vienna his health broke down when he was sharing the lead with Adolf Albin. 

He won matches against Bernhard Fleissig (2:0) in 1890, and Albin (4:0) and Marco (3:1), both in 1891.

J.H. Bauer is known mainly for losing to Emanuel Lasker as a result of a brilliant double-bishop sacrifice at Amsterdam 1889.

He died of tuberculosis at the age of 29.

See also
 Lasker versus Bauer, Amsterdam, 1889
 List of chess games

References

External links 
 

1861 births
1891 deaths
19th-century Czech people
19th-century Austrian people
Austrian chess players
Czech chess players
Austrian people of Czech descent
19th-century deaths from tuberculosis
People from Beroun District
19th-century chess players
Tuberculosis deaths in Italy
Infectious disease deaths in Friuli Venezia Giulia